Lin'an District is one of ten urban districts of the prefecture-level city of Hangzhou, the capital of Zhejiang Province, East China. It is located in northwest Zhejiang as a separate urban area of Hangzhou, and borders Anhui province to the west and northwest. The postal code is 311300, and the phone area code 0571.

May 2015, Lin'an was listed as the Top 100 Economic Potential City/County, ranking 73. Lin'an also voted as No. 16 Innovative County. After the promotion of Fuyang District, Lin'an was converted into the 10th district of Hangzhou . The Lin'an government is located at 398 Yijin Street.

Lin'an is rich in natural resources, abundant in rainfall, and has a warm climate. All of these factors work together allowing the district to be covered with 71.3% forest. Such an ecological environment breeds more than 4,700 biological species. Mountains, lakes, forest, hot springs, caves, and other ancient remains are everywhere. The district's Daming Mountain and Tianmu Mountain are its well-known attractions.

Geography and climate 
The climate in Lin'an is temperate and humid subtropical monsoon.

Administrative divisions
Subdistricts:
Jincheng Subdistrict (锦城街道), Linglong Subdistrict (玲珑街道), Shanggan Subdistrict (上甘街道), Qingshanhu Subdistrict (青山湖街道), Jinbei Subdistrict (锦北街道)

Towns:
Banqiao (板桥镇), Gaohong (高虹镇), Taihu (太湖镇), Yuqian (於潜镇), Tianmushan (天目山镇), Taiyang (太阳镇), Qianchuan (潜川镇), Changhua (昌化镇), Longgang (龙岗镇), Heqiao (河桥镇), Tuankou (湍口镇), Qingliangfeng (清凉峰镇), Daoshi (岛石镇)

Townships:
Huanshan Township (环山乡), Huyuan Township (湖源乡), Shangguan Township (上官乡), Yushan Township (渔山乡), Chunjian Township (春建乡), Xintong Township (新桐乡)

Economy

Tourism
Daming Mountain
Tianmu Mountain
Qingshan Lake

Education

Higher education
Zhejiang A&F University

Public primary and secondary education
Linan High School
Yuqian High School
Changhua High School
Jincheng NO.1 Middle School
Jincheng NO.2 Middle School
Jincheng NO.4 Middle School
Yijin Elementary School
Chenxi Elementary School
Chengbei Elementary School
Chengnan Elementary School
Shijing Elementary School

Private and alternative education 
 Hangzhou Tianmu Foreign Language School

Transport 
Lin'an is connected to the main urban area of Hangzhou through Line 16 of the Hangzhou Metro and the G56 Hangzhou–Ruili Expressway.

Notable people
Qian Liu (852-932), known as Qian Poliu during his childhood, was a warlord of the late Tang dynasty who founded the Wuyue kingdom.
Dong Chang (died 896), warlord who became a short-lived emperor in modern Zhejiang.
Qian Xuesen, ancestral home in Zhejiang.

References

External links
Official website of Lin'an Government
Amateur Photo Gallery of Linan
Mandarin Capital Chinese Language Institute

Geography of Hangzhou
Districts of Zhejiang